Manuela Saragosa (born September 1967) is a Dutch-Italian radio business journalist, most commonly found on the BBC World Service.

Early life
Manuela Saragosa was born in Sweden, she then moved to Indonesia, then moved to England. She is widowed.

From 1986-89 she attended the LSE, where she studied for a BSc Econ in International Relations, (2:1). From 1990-91 she attended the SOAS, University of London.

Career
From 1993-97 she worked as a foreign correspondent for the Financial Times (FT). In 1998 she worked for Radio Netherlands Worldwide.

BBC World Service
In January 1999 she joined the BBC World Service. From October 2004 to March 2005 she was also the BBC's Europe Business Correspondent in Brussels. She has also occasionally reported for BBC Radio 4 on The World Tonight.

On the World Service, she presents Business Daily and World Business Report.

Personal life
She lives in south-west London. She has two children.

References

External links
 Business Daily

1967 births
Alumni of SOAS University of London
Alumni of the London School of Economics
BBC Radio 4 presenters
BBC World Service presenters
Business and financial journalists
Financial Times people
Italian radio journalists
Radio Netherlands Worldwide
Living people